David Ferrer successfully defended his title by defeating Philipp Kohlschreiber in the final, 7–6(7–5), 6–1.

Seeds

Draw

Finals

Top half

Bottom half

Qualifying

Seeds

Qualifiers

Draw

First qualifier

Second qualifier

Third qualifier

Fourth qualifier

References
 Main Draw
 Qualifying Draw

2013 Heineken Open